Krum Ivanov Georgiev (born May 24, 1958) is a Bulgarian chess grandmaster, born in Pazardzhik. He beat Garry Kasparov in a wild game in Malta, 1980.

Georgiev earned the International Master (IM) title in 1977 and the Grandmaster (GM) title in 1988.

References

External links

1958 births
Living people
Chess grandmasters
Bulgarian chess players
Bulgarian people of Greek descent
People from Pazardzhik